"Rikki Don't Lose That Number" is a single released in 1974 by rock/jazz rock group Steely Dan and the opening track of their third album Pretzel Logic. It was the most successful single of the group's career, peaking at number 4 on the Billboard Hot 100 in the summer of 1974.

The song features Jim Gordon on drums, as does the bulk of the Pretzel Logic album. The guitar solo is by Jeff "Skunk" Baxter who would soon go on to join The Doobie Brothers.

Victor Feldman's flapamba introduction to the song, which opens the album, is cut from the original ABC single version. The MCA single reissue (backed with "Pretzel Logic") includes the flapamba intro but fades out just before the actual end of the track. The introductory riff is an almost direct copy of the intro of Horace Silver's jazz classic "Song for My Father".

Appraisal 
Reviewing the single for AllMusic, Stewart Mason said:Just to clear up a generation's worth of rumors about the lyrics of "Rikki Don't Lose That Number," Walter Becker stated for the record in a 1985 interview in the pages of Musician that the "number" in question was not slang for a marijuana cigarette ("send it off in a letter to yourself," supposedly a way to safely transport one's dope back before the post office abolished general delivery mail, was held up as the key line), and an uncharacteristically forthcoming Donald Fagen has similarly revealed that the "Rikki" in question was simply a woman he'd had a crush on in college [writer Rikki Ducornet]. It says something about Steely Dan's reputation as obscurantists that even a straightforward lost-love song like "Rikki Don't Lose That Number" could be so widely over-interpreted. ... It's unsurprising that "Rikki Don't Lose That Number" ended up becoming Steely Dan's biggest commercial hit ... as it's one of the group's most gentle and accessible songs.

Billboard described it as a "catchy, almost tango-like tune."  Cash Box said that the "strong accent on harmonies with keyboard and percussion dominating the musical end make for a very entertaining track." Record World said that the "salty Latin-ish sound is in an easy vein" and that the song was a "totally nifty number."

Personnel

Musicians

 Donald Fagen – lead and backing vocals
 Jeff Baxter – electric guitar
 Dean Parks – acoustic guitar
 Michael Omartian – piano
 Walter Becker – bass guitar, backing vocals
 Jim Gordon – drums
 Victor Feldman – percussion, flapamba
 Timothy B. Schmit – backing vocals

Technical
 Gary Katz – Producer
 Roger Nichols – Engineer

Chart performance

Weekly charts

Year-end charts

Cover versions
 1983Kenji Omura recorded a version of the song for his fourth album Gaijin Heaven.
 1984Tom Robinson recorded his version for the album Hope and Glory; the single release of the song matched Steely Dan's original version by peaking at No. 58 in the UK Singles Chart.
 1992Hank Marvin did an instrumental of the song on his album Into the Light.
 1994Far Corporation made a cover of the song for their album Solitude.
 2007Chuck Loeb did an instrumental cover of the song on his album Presence.

Usage in media
 The song was featured in the 1989 film Say Anything..., in which the lyrics were sung by actor John Mahoney.
The song was referenced in the 2004 Fairly Odd Parents episode, "Odd Couple." At the end, as Vicky's former boyfriend Rikki drives away with his new lover, she says "Rikki! Don't lose my number! You don't wanna call nobody else!"

References

External links
 

1974 singles
Steely Dan songs
Songs written by Donald Fagen
Songs written by Walter Becker
ABC Records singles
1974 songs
Tom Robinson songs
Song recordings produced by Gary Katz
Songs about telephone calls